Über Goober A Film About Gamers is a 2004 independent documentary film focusing on people who play role-playing games. The film was directed by Steve Metze and features interviews with Gary Gygax, Peter Adkison, Mike Stackpole and Bob Larson, amongst others. The film has screened at theatres, film festivals, and gaming conventions, winning the award for "Best Film" at Gen Con Indianapolis, 2004.

Reviews
Pyramid

References

External links 

 
 

2000s English-language films
2004 films
2004 documentary films
American documentary films
2000s American films